State v. Christy Pontiac-GMC, Inc., Minnesota Supreme Court, 354 N.W.2d 17 (1984), is a criminal case in which it was held that "a corporation may be convicted of theft and forgery, which are crimes requiring specific intent".

References

1984 in United States case law
U.S. state criminal case law
Law articles needing an infobox